Giulia Casoni and Mariya Koryttseva were the defending champions, but none competed this year. Casoni retired from professional tennis during this season, after struggling with a knee injury.

Janette Husárová and Michaëlla Krajicek won the title by defeating qualifiers Alice Canepa and Giulia Gabba 6–0, 6–0 in the final.

This tournament saw an unusual event, as all seeded pairs were eliminated in the first round.

Seeds

Draw

Draw

References

External links
 Official results archive (ITF)
 Official results archive (WTA)

Internazionali Femminili di Palermo - Doubles
2006 Doubles